This is a list of films produced by the Ollywood film industry in 2013.

List of released films

References

2013
Ollywood
2010s in Odisha
Ollywood